Kewra, keora or kewda is an essential oil distilled from the male flower of the fragrant screwpine. The plant is native to Tropical Asia, Southeast Asia and Australasia, and the oil is used as a flavoring agent throughout much of these regions.

The flower is a vital ingredient in Kewra and is used in special-occasion dishes in South Asia, particularly those associated with Muslim communities. Kewra flowers have a sweet, perfumed odour with a pleasant quality similar to rose flowers, but kewra is more fruity. The aqueous distillate (kewra water, pandanus flower water) is quite diluted.. Kewra flowers & leaves are also essential in worship of Hindu goddess Manasa, who is worshipped by certain communities.

Approximately 95% of kewra flowers exported from India are collected from areas surrounding Berhampur city in Ganjam district. The coastal areas of Chhatrapur, Rangeilunda, Patrapur, and Chikiti are famous for their aromatic pandanus plantations. Arguably, flowers from coastal locales have an exquisite floral note that rival inland varieties with the most famous varieties being those endemic and cultivated in Gopalpur-on-Sea. Cultivation of kewra flower is a major source of income in Ganjam district and there are nearly 200 registered kewra distillation factories.
Kewra is also used in traditional Indian perfumery, both as functional fragrance and in ittar.

Chemical composition: abstract 

The chemical composition of the essential oils obtained by water distillation of the staminate inflorescences of Kewda (Pandanus odorifer. var. fasicularis). The major components of kewda oil were found to be 2-phenethyl methyl ether (65.6–75.4%), Terpinen-4-ol (11.7–19.5%), p-Cymene (1.0–3.1%) and Alpha Terpineol (1.2–2.9%)

See also 
 Ganjam Kewda Flower
 Ganjam Kewda Rooh

References 

Bangladeshi cuisine
Indian cuisine
Pakistani cuisine
Uttar Pradeshi cuisine
Pandanus